The United States Virgin Islands Department of Education is the education agency of the U.S. Virgin Islands. The agency has its headquarters in St. Thomas.

References

External links

 

State departments of education of the United States
Government of the United States Virgin Islands